The following is a list of Army Black Knights football seasons for the football team that represents the United States Military Academy in NCAA competition.

Seasons

References 

Army West Point Black Knights
Army Black Knights football seasons